Oxylamia basilewskyi is a species of beetle in the family Cerambycidae. It was described by Stephan von Breuning in 1975. It is known from Tanzania.

References

Endemic fauna of Tanzania
Lamiini
Beetles described in 1975